is a former Japanese football player.  Hoshino previously played for Ehime FC in the J2 League.

Club statistics

References

External links

1978 births
Living people
Aichi Gakuin University alumni
Association football people from Fukuoka Prefecture
Japanese footballers
J2 League players
Japan Football League players
Ehime FC players
Association football defenders